
Gmina Lubenia is a rural gmina (administrative district) in Rzeszów County, Subcarpathian Voivodeship, in south-eastern Poland.

Villages
Gmina Lubenia contains the villages and settlements of Lubenia, Siedliska, Sołonka and Straszydle.

Neighbouring gminas
Gmina Lubenia is bordered by the gminas of Błażowa, Boguchwała, Czudec, Niebylec and Tyczyn.

References

Lubenia
Rzeszów County